Gustav Humbert (born February 1950 in Celle, West Germany) is the former chief executive officer and president of Airbus SAS, and a former member of the EADS executive committee.

Airbus 
Humbert joined Airbus management in July 2000, as the chief operating officer and a member of the EADS' (Airbus' parent company) executive committee, and in March 2004 he was appointed Airbus' executive vice-president – programmes. 

In June 2005 he was appointed Airbus president and chief executive officer, a position he held until 2 July 2006, when he resigned from these various positions as a result of further delays on the Airbus A380 production line and other delivery program setbacks, announced the previous month, on 14 June.

Resignation 
While announcing his resignation, Humbert said the delays were a "major disappointment" for Airbus, and "as President and CEO of Airbus, must take responsibility for this setback and ... offer my resignation to our shareholders."

Personal 
Humbert holds a degree in mechanical engineering from the Hannover Technical University as well as a PhD in engineering from the Leibniz University Hannover , and was even a visiting professor of mechanical engineering at McGill University in Montreal in 1979.

See also 
EADS
Airbus
DASA
DaimlerChrysler
Airbus A380
Noël Forgeard

References

External links 
Airbus Website
Humbert's Biography (by Airbus)
Airbus A380 Sub-site
EADS homepage

1950 births
Living people
German businesspeople in transport
People from Celle
Chief operating officers
Businesspeople from Lower Saxony